is a 2008 Japanese comedy starring Kaho and Gorie, directed by Makoto Tanaka, about a school choir competition. Kasumi loves singing until she is given a photo of herself mid-song by a boy she likes..

See also
Mongol800

External links
Official website

2008 films
2008 comedy-drama films
Teen musical films
2000s musical comedy films
2000s Japanese films